The Disastrous Life of Saiki K. is an anime television series produced by Egg Firm and J.C. Staff, based on the manga series created by Shūichi Asō and published in Shueisha's Weekly Shōnen Jump  magazine. The series follows Kusuo Saiki, a high school student with all manner of psychic abilities, who constantly faces misery caused by both his powers and the strange people around him. The series began airing in Japan on TV Tokyo from July 4, 2016, airing five short episodes each week followed by a compilation episode, the series will contain one hundred and twenty episodes in total, along with twenty four compilation episodes. The series is licensed in North America by Funimation, who are simulcasting the series as it airs and began releasing an English dub from August 7, 2016.

Episode list

Season 1 
A = Compilation episode order, B = Short episode order

Season 2

Special 

A one-hour special called   which is used as the finale of the Disastrous Life of Saiki K anime series aired on December 28, 2018. It adapts the last chapters published from Weekly Shonen Jump.

Reawakened 

Titled The Disastrous Life of Saiki K. Starting Arc or The Disastrous Life of Saiki K. Reawakened, this 6-episode series premiered on December 30, 2019, on Netflix worldwide.

Notes

References

Disastrous Life of Saiki K., The